A galley is a ship or boat primarily powered by multiple sets of oars.

Galley may also refer to:

Nautical uses
 birlinn or Highland galley, a ship of medieval Scotland
 A larger type of Gig (boat), a ship's boat
 galley slave, a slave rowing in a galley
 Galley (kitchen), the kitchen of a ship or boat (also airplane or rail passenger car)

Other uses

 Galley (kitchen), the kitchen of a rail passenger car, ship or an airplane
 Galley (surname)
 Galley (heraldry) or lymphad, a charge
 Galley division, a mathematical technique
 Galley Museum, a museum in Tasmania
 Galley proof, a preliminary version of a publication

See also

 
 

 Galija, a Serbian rock band

 NetGalley, a web site aimed towards the distribution of digital galley proofs of books
 Galle (disambiguation)
 Galli (disambiguation)
 Gally (disambiguation)